Alexandru Mugurel Dedu (born 1 March 1985) is a Romanian former footballer who played as an attacking midfielder or forward for teams such as Pandurii Târgu Jiu, CS Otopeni, Politehnica Iași, Gloria Buzău or CS Afumați, among others.

Honours
CS Afumați
Liga III: 2020–21, 2021–22

External links

1985 births
Living people
Romanian footballers
Association football midfielders
Liga I players
Liga II players
Liga III players
CSM Jiul Petroșani players
CS Pandurii Târgu Jiu players
CS Otopeni players
FC Politehnica Iași (2010) players
SCM Râmnicu Vâlcea players
FC Gloria Buzău players
CS Afumați players